Cristián Sánchez may refer to:

 Cristián Sánchez (director) (born 1951), Chilean film director
 Cristián Sánchez (footballer) (born 1991), Argentine footballer
 Cristián Sánchez (presenter) (born 1972), Chilean presenter

See also
 Christian Sánchez (disambiguation)